People's Artist of Azerbaijan (Azerbaijani: Xalq rəssamı) is the honorary title and award granted for contribution to the development of Azerbaijani culture.

History 
The People's Artists of the Azerbaijan SSR (1931–1990) was a precursor award given during the time of the Azerbaijan Soviet Socialist Republic, Soviet Union.

In May 22, 1998, the honorary title "People's Artist of Azerbaijan" was established by Decree of the President of the Republic of Azerbaijan, along with some other titles. The President of Azerbaijan confers the honorary title on his initiative, as well as on the proposal of the National Assembly and the Cabinet of Ministers. The title is awarded only to citizens of Azerbaijan. According to the decree, the honorary title of "People's Artist of Azerbaijan" cannot be awarded to the same person repeatedly. A person awarded an honorary title may be deprived of the title in cases of misconduct.

Persons awarded the honorary title "People's Artist of Azerbaijan" also receive a certificate and a badge of the honorary title of the Republic of Azerbaijan. The badge of honor is worn on the right side of the chest.

People's Artists of Azerbaijan 

 Nadir Gasimov
 Tofig Agababayev
 Davud Kazimov
 Rafig Mehdiyev
 Gullu Mustafayeva
 Nazim Bekkishiev
 Oktay Sadikhzade
 Eljan Shamilov
 Taghi Taghiyev
 Oktay Shikhaliev
 Khanlar Azmedov
 Kamil Khanlarov
 Mais Agabekov
 Mammadaga Huseynov
 Rafiz Ismayilov
 Kamal Alekperov
 Altai Gadzhiev
 Farkhad Khalilov
 Arif Huseynov
 Agali Ibragimov
 Asaf Jafarov
 Fazil Najafov
 Salkhab Mammadov
 Togrul Narimanbekov
 Mirnadir Zeynalov
 Fuad Salayev
 Eldar Mikayilzadeh
 Akif Askerov
 Arif Azizov
 Ashraf Geybatov
 Arif Gaziev
 Sakit Mammadov
 Sirus Mirzazadeh

See also 
 List of People's Artists of the Azerbaijan SSR
 People’s Artist

References 

Honorary titles of Azerbaijan
People's Artists of Azerbaijan